Philip Hallen Dybvig (born May 22, 1955) is an American economist. He is the Boatmen's Bancshares Professor of Banking and Finance at the Olin Business School of Washington University in St. Louis.

Career 
Dybvig specializes in asset pricing, banking, investments, and corporate governance. He was formerly a professor at Yale University, and assistant professor at Princeton University. 

Dybvig was president of the Western Finance Association from 2002 to 2003, and was director of the Institute of Financial Studies at Southwestern University of Finance and Economics (Chengdu, PRC) from 2010 to 2021. He has been editor or associate editor of multiple journals, including the Journal of Economic Theory, Finance and Stochastics, Journal of Finance, Journal of Financial Intermediation, Journal of Financial and Quantitative Analysis, and Review of Financial Studies.

Dybvig is known for his work with Douglas Diamond on the Diamond–Dybvig model of bank runs. 

Dybvig was awarded the 2022 Nobel Memorial Prize in Economic Sciences, jointly with Diamond and Ben Bernanke, "for research on banks and financial crises". Dybvig and Diamond wrote “Bank Runs, Deposit Insurance, and Liquidity” in 1983, in which they first introduced their mathematical model describing the vulnerability of banks during financial crises.

Alleged sexual misconduct 
In October 2022, Dybvig was anonymously accused of sexual harassment by several Chinese women attending Washington University’s Olin School of Business, where Dybvig works as a professor. He is on absentee leave until July 2023. Dybvig's lawyer has denied the allegations. Bloomberg News reported that he called one of the students "tián mèizi" (甜妹子), meaning "sweet young girl" and gave her gifts of chocolate. The encounters led the Chinese female students to warn each other about him.

References

External links 
 Faculty webpage at the Olin Business School, Washington University
 Multiple Equilibria, Nobel Prize lecture, 8 December 2022
 

1955 births
21st-century American economists
Living people
Nobel laureates in Economics
Washington University in St. Louis faculty
Yale University faculty
20th-century American economists
American Nobel laureates
Academic staff of the Southwestern University of Finance and Economics

nds:Philip Hallen Dybvig